Salomon Arvid Achates Lindman (19 September 1862 – 9 December 1936) was a Swedish rear admiral, industrialist and conservative politician who served as Prime Minister of Sweden from 1906 to 1911 and again from 1928 to 1930.

He was also the leader of the conservative General Electoral Union between 1912 and 1935 as well as leader of Lantmanna- och borgarepartiet (a member party of the General Electoral Union) from 1913 to 1935, except for a short while during 1917 when he served as Minister for Foreign Affairs.

His two tenures as Prime Minister, from 1906 to 1911 and from 1928 to 1930, spanned the introduction of parliamentarianism and universal suffrage. Lindman married Annie Almström in 1888, with whom he had three children.

Biography
Arvid Lindman was born in Österbybruk, Sweden, the son of managing director Achates Lindman and Ebba Dahlgren. His career as a naval officer 1882–92 reached its peak in 1907 when he was appointed as Rear Admiral in the naval reserve. During his political career following this he became known primarily as "the Admiral". Lindman was CEO of Iggesunds Bruk from 1892 to 1903 and of Strömbacka bruks AB between 1903 and 1923. In 1904, he also became Director-general of Televerket.

In 1902 he had declined the post as Minister for Finance in Boström's second cabinet but started a political career in 1905 when he became both Ministry for Naval Affairs (for the Navy and the Coastal Artillery) in Lundeberg's broad-based cabinet and a member of the Riksdag's first chamber.

Staaff's liberal cabinet had hoped to instate complete suffrage for all draft-abiding male citizens under the first past the post system, with implicit support for women's suffrage as well; during the proposal Lindman was appointed Prime Minister at head of a moderate-conservative government. Through great political skill Lindman managed to enact universal suffrage for male citizens according to the principle of "double proportionality" – in both chambers of parliament – in 1907–09. His six-year government oversaw a number of reforms in the areas of industry, schools and social politics. A defence committee was appointed, decisions were made to build up the navy, and the international position of Sweden was confirmed in the Nordic and Baltic Sea agreements. Political and economic opposition resulted in the general strike of 1909, but the strike failed, and Lindman's government was allowed to remain in power, ostensibly supported by the king.

Extended suffrage and proportional representation (under the d'Hondt method) had preserved the right as a parliamentary force yet contributed to a success for the left-wing coalition, when the Liberals and the Social Democrats won the election for the second chamber in 1911. Lindman transferred to the second chamber where he was chairman for the second-chamber right 1912-35, with an interruption in 1917 when he became Minister for Foreign Affairs in Swartz's cabinet. As a leading right-wing politician he had given advice to the King about the creation of the Hammarskjöld and Swartz cabinets, with the goal of blocking the more hard-edged conservative leader of the first-chamber right, Ernst Trygger.

During the years 1913-35, Lindman was chairman for the national organisation of right-wing parties, the General Electoral Union – the predecessor of the present Moderate Party – and as such was a driving force in the work to modernize the party organisation, especially after the constitutional change in 1918 which instituted universal male suffrage. Among other innovations he hired an airplane to take him on speaking tours of the country and introduced the political poster. The GEU lost its status as largest party in 1917 to the Social Democrats, which has retained it since (with near-equal support for the parties in the general election of 2010). Proportional representation, however, managed to sustain a considerable support though surpassed by both Liberals and Social Democrats; with the single-member constituencies advanced by Staaff's Liberals had likely diminished all influence.

After a hard-fought electoral campaign in 1928, when the Social Democrats had controversially formed a coalition with some Communists and suffered great losses in the election, Lindman formed a right-wing government in minority, after the liberals and the Freeminded (pro-Prohibition liberals) had turned down the King's request for a broader center-right majority government. Among the things this government did, the calling of the conference on peace in the workplace (a move to try to end frequent strikes and lock-outs) in 1928 is worth mentioning. The government resigned in 1930 after the Freeminded and the Social Democrats blocked the proposition for raised customs duty on grain, the goal of which was the strengthening of the agrarian sector. No party or union commanded a majority, which made the 1920s and early 1930s notoriously turbulent.

Lindman was a modern kind of party leader, who with involvement and eloquence turned directly to the voters. Both as an industrialist and as a politician he was energetic and goal-oriented. He was a pragmatic conservative without losing his principles and an effective political peace-broker, who sought a policy of compromise with his adversaries. From early on he was strongly opposed to nazism and fascism. When his party's youth organisation started organising uniformed fascist action groups in the 1930s, he saw to it that they were expelled from the party . The "honest thanks over the battle lines" from the social democratic leader Per Albin Hansson when Lindman resigned as party leader in favor of the younger academic and professor Gösta Bagge in 1935 was an expression of the wide-ranging respect that he had.

Lindman died in an aircraft crash on 9 December 1936, when the Douglas DC-2 in which he was travelling crashed into houses near Croydon Airport just after taking off in thick fog.

References

External links

1862 births
1936 deaths
People from Östhammar Municipality
Leaders of the Moderate Party
Members of the Första kammaren
Victims of aviation accidents or incidents in England
State leaders killed in aviation accidents or incidents
Prime Ministers of Sweden
Swedish Ministers for Foreign Affairs
Swedish Navy rear admirals
Members of the Andra kammaren
Burials at Norra begravningsplatsen
Great Depression in Sweden
Victims of aviation accidents or incidents in 1936
Accidental deaths in London
Knights of the Order of Charles XIII
Honorary Knights Grand Cross of the Royal Victorian Order